The Shadow Theory is the twelfth studio album by the American power metal band Kamelot. The album is produced by Sascha Paeth and was released on April 6, 2018. Guests on the album include Lauren Hart and Jennifer Haben.

It is the only studio album to feature Johan Nunez, replacing longtime member Casey Grillo on drums, who had departed from the band on February 5, 2018, to pursue other musical and touring opportunities and to focus on his drumhead company.

Track listing

Personnel
All information from the album booklet.

Kamelot
 Tommy Karevik – vocals
 Thomas Youngblood – guitars
 Sean Tibbetts – bass
 Oliver Palotai – keyboards
 Johan Nunez – drums, percussion

Guest musicians
 Lauren Hart – guest vocals and growls on "Phantom Divine (Shadow Empire)" and growls on "MindFall Remedy"
 Jennifer Haben – guest vocals on "In Twilight Hours"

Choir
 Oliver Hartmann, Herbie Langhans, Cloudy Yang, Annie Berens, Nadine Ruch, Evelyn Mank, Thomas Dalton Youngblood

Crew
 Sascha Paeth – production, mixing, engineering, additional guitars and keys, and growls on "The Proud and the Broken"
 Thomas Youngblood – engineering, editing
 Oliver Palotai – orchestral arrangements, engineering, editing
 Jacob Hansen – mastering
 Stefan Heilemann – artwork
 Arne Wiegand – engineering, editing
 Miro Rodenberg – engineering, editing
 Olaf Reitmeier – engineering, editing
 Logan Mader – engineering, editing
 Tim Tronckoe – photography

Charts

References

2018 albums
Kamelot albums
Napalm Records albums